Batalá NYC was the original New York City branch of the international samba reggae project called Batalá. Founded in March 2012 by Stacy Kovacs with an initial membership of 16 women, which eventually grew to a membership of over 65 women ranging in age from 14 to 70 years old. The band changed musical director in July 2016 when members split to form two bands: Batalá New York and FogoAzul NYC.

History

Artistic Director Stacy Kovacs first encountered members of Batalá Mundo performing in the 2011 Brazil Day celebration in New York City. Following this introduction to Batalá and a growing interest in samba reggae, Kovacs traveled to Brazil in 2012 for that year's Carnaval in Salvador da Bahia. Kovacs brought back 35 drums, and Batalá NYC had their first rehearsal in March 2012.

Batalá NYC dissolved in July, 2016. Most of its members then created Batalá New York, a continuation of the original band: an all-female, female-led banda de percussão (percussion-based band) that promotes Afro-Brazilian culture and women's empowerment through high energy, visually stimulating percussion performances. Batalá New York plays from the same repertoire of northeastern Brazilian songs that Batalá NYC drew upon. It is a chapter of the broader global arts project Batalá Mundo.

Kovacs, together with some members of the original Batalá NYC, founded a new musical entity she named FogoAzul NYC, now playing the music of Marcus Santos' music education network Grooversity. FogoAzul NYC now has 70 women drummers who are there to drum and enjoy the music of Grooversity and Brazil. The band takes women of all musical levels, mostly beginners, and teaches them to drum. FogoAzul means Blue Fire in Portuguese.

Performances
Batalá NYC performed with notable acts such as The Rolling Stones, participated in many events including New York's Village Halloween Parade, and took part in benefit concerts for One Billion Rising. The band was also featured on the cover of Issue 11 of Tom Tom Magazine.

References

External links 
FogoAzul NYC
Official Batala NYC site
 Meet Batalá NYC, the All-Female Brazilian Drum Troupe That Might Play Gloria Steinem’s Funeral. Brooklyn magazine, 16 July 2015.

Percussion organizations
Women's musical groups
Samba ensembles
American reggae musical groups
Musical groups from New York City